Ash Grove is an unincorporated community in Tippecanoe Township, Tippecanoe County, Indiana, located just north of Battle Ground.

The community is part of the Lafayette, Indiana Metropolitan Statistical Area.

History
A post office was established at Ash Grove in 1865, and remained in operation until it was discontinued in 1910.

Geography
Ash Grove is located in Tippecanoe Township at an elevation of 666 feet.

References

Unincorporated communities in Tippecanoe County, Indiana
Unincorporated communities in Indiana
Lafayette metropolitan area, Indiana